Bill Stapleton may refer to:
 Bill Stapleton (swimmer) (born 1965), American former swimmer and former general manager of the U.S. Postal Service Pro Cycling Team
 Bill Stapleton (musician) (1945–1984), American jazz trumpeter and arranger